Leyla Hazal Kaya (born 1 October 1990) is a Turkish actress. She is best known for playing the role of Nihal Ziyagil in the TV series Aşk-ı Memnu, Feriha Sarrafoglu, Adını Feriha Koydum (2011–2012) and Filiz in Bizim Hikaye (inspired by the British TV show Shameless) (2017–2019).

Early life 
Kaya was born in Konya, Turkey, to an Alevi Muslim family from Gaziantep. She attended Gaziosmanpaşa elementary school and graduated in 2009 from the Liceo Italiano di Istanbul. She enrolled in Istanbul Bilgi University for her higher education. Her parents, who are both lawyers, divorced when she was 7 years old. She was introduced to the art and acting world at a very young age, and as a child she took ballet and violin lessons for 7 years. Kaya speaks Italian and English fluently, in addition to her native language Turkish. She was also said to be learning a fourth language, German.

Career 
Kaya started her acting career in 2006 with TV series Genco. She played the character of Özge (Gülay Erkaya). She had guest roles in fantasy series Acemi Cadı of Turkish version "Sabrina Teenage Witch", popular series Sıla, "Taşların Sırrı". In 2008, Kaya played Nihal Ziyagil in a modern-day adaptation of the novel Aşk-ı Memnu, written by Halit Ziya Uşaklıgil. She had her cinematic debut in Selçuk Aydemir's movie Çalgı Çengi in 2011. At the same time she took lessons from Ayla Algan in drama. She then joined Ümit Çırak Modern Acting Techniques Workshop and took acting lessons from Ümit Çırak himself.

Kaya played in the first two seasons of the TV series Adını Feriha Koydum (2011) as the lead character, Feriha Sarrafoğlu. She played the role of a porter's daughter trapped between two lives and falls in love with the most popular student at her university, a rich and handsome boy "Emir Sarrafoğlu" (Çağatay Ulusoy). The series had one of the highest TV ratings in Turkey. Later, together with her mother Ayşegül Kaya, she appeared in the commercials for Bingo. In the late 2012, she left the cast of Adını Feriha Koydum and starred in a new series called Son Yaz Balkanlar 1912, portraying the character Emine. However, the series ended after a few episodes due to low ratings. She later appeared in the 2013 series A.Ş.K and played the character of Azra Özak, a tennis coach. That series also ended after 13 episodes. In 2015 she appeared in Maral: En Güzel Hikayem, opposite Aras Bulut İynemli. She played the leading character Maral Erdem. Her latest TV show is Bizim Hikaye (in English: Our Story), which is the Turkish adaptation of the American TV series Shameless. In this TV show Kaya plays "Filiz Elibol Aktan", opposite actor Burak Deniz. As of 2021, she shares the leading roles with Bugra Gulsoy and Ozan Dolunay in the TV series Misafir, an adaptation of the Japanese TV series Oasis. Since 2010, she appears as Behzat's dead daughter "Berna" in some episodes and film of hit crime series Behzat Ç..

Personal life
She married actor Ali Atay on 6 February 2019, and gave birth to their son later that year. Their daughter was born in February 2023.

In the media
Kaya is one of Turkey's highest-paid actresses. Ichaps, having chosen the most important names of 2014 in many categories, included Hazal Kaya among the "most influential names in the world" and granted her the medal of international excellence in the category of artists. According to the results of a survey conducted on the United Arab Emirates-based MBC channels, which ranked Turkish series and special programs, she ranked 4th on the list of most admired Turkish women artists. At the same time, official surveys covering the August 2010–August 2015 period, taken in 35 countries, placed her 6th on the list of 10 most popular actresses. She was also the only Turkish recipient of the "Lebanon Awards 2015" award. According to the results obtained from 35 countries between May 2011 and May 2016, Kaya was the 6th most popular actress. In May 2016, she rose to number five on the list. The website World's Most Beautifuls ranked her fifth on the list of 10 most beautiful women of 2016.

Filmography

Film

Television

Web series

In other media

In advertising

In music videos

Awards

References

External links 

1990 births
Turkish film actresses
Turkish television actresses
21st-century Turkish actresses
Models from Istanbul
Living people
Liceo Italiano alumni
Istanbul Bilgi University alumni
Actresses from Istanbul
People from Konya
Turkish Alevis